The Last Outlaw is a 1936 American Western film directed by Christy Cabanne from a screenplay by John Twist and Jack Townley. The original story was credited to  "E. Murray Campbell" (Evelyne Murray Campbell, who wrote it in 1919) and John Ford, who directed the 1919 version. Harry Carey starred in both versions.

The premise has Carey as a notorious outlaw jailed in 1911. Twenty-five years later he is released, and finds that the world has moved on without him. His reputation as the terror of the west has been forgotten, and he has trouble adjusting to life in the city. He joins forces with the sheriff who originally caught him (Henry B. Walthall) to track down the new terror (Tom Tyler).

RKO Radio Pictures previewed the film with a running time of 73 minutes. It was edited to 68 minutes, and finally released as a standard "program western" running 62 minutes. In the trade it was considered a "sleeper", with a novel storyline and treatment. Variety reported that studio executives were upset about the picture being mishandled, and that it might have succeeded as a higher-budgeted "A" picture. In recent years the UCLA Film Archives restored the film to 72 minutes; this is the version shown on Turner Classic Movies today.

Cast
Harry Carey as	Dean Payton
Hoot Gibson as Chuck Wilson
Tom Tyler as Al Goss
Henry B. Walthall as Cal Yates
Margaret Callahan as Sally Mason
Ray Mayer as Henchman
Harry Jans as Jess - Henchman
Frank M. Thomas as Dr. Charles Mason
Russell Hopton as Sheriff Arthur Billings
Frank Jenks as Deputy Tom
Harry Woods as Traffic Cop
Maxine Jennings as Billings's Secretary
Ralph Byrd as Pilot
Fred Scott as Larry Dixon, Singing Movie Cowboy
Stanley Blystone as Jailer (uncredited) 
Alan Curtis as Driver (uncredited)

References

External links

1936 films
1936 Western (genre) films
American Western (genre) films
Films directed by Christy Cabanne
American black-and-white films
Films produced by Samuel J. Briskin
RKO Pictures films
1930s English-language films
1930s American films